The National Middle School Science Bowl is a middle school academic competition, similar to Quiz Bowl, held in the United States. Two teams of four students each compete to answer various science-related questions. In order to determine which student has the right to answer the question, a buzzer system (or "lockout system") is used, similar to those seen on popular television game shows such as Jeopardy!. The National Middle School Science Bowl (" NMSSB") has been organized and sponsored by the United States Department of Energy since the competition's inception in 2002.

Subject areas
Questions are asked in the categories of Biology, Chemistry, Earth and Space Science, Energy (dealing with DOE research), Mathematics, and Physics.

Before the 2010 year, there was no Energy category, and Earth and Space Science was called Earth Science. The General Science category was dropped in 2017.

Regional competitions
Each year, in late April or early May, the National Science Bowl competition is held in Chevy Chase, Maryland in the National 4-H Youth Conference Center.

The winning team of each regional Science Bowl competition is invited to participate in the National Science Bowl all expenses paid. There are a number of regional competitions all over the United States; the exact amount changes from year to year.

Typically, any middle school that meets the eligibility rules of the National Middle School Science Bowl competition is permitted to register for any regional competition in the country, but no middle school or student group may compete in multiple regionals. In addition, some regional competitions permit schools to register up to three teams. Teams composed entirely of homeschooled students are also permitted to enter.

Rules

This section is concerned with the rules of the national competition. The rules of regional competitions vary greatly. There are very few prescribed rules for regional competitions. Some regionals are run nearly identically to the national competition, while others use variations of the rules or different methods of scoring.

General rules
A team consists of four or five students from a single middle school (unless the team is composed entirely of home schooled students). Only four students play at any one time, while the fifth is designated as the "alternate." Substitutions may be made during the two-minute "halftime" and between rounds.

Two teams compete against each other in each match. Each match has exactly 25 questions (that is, 25 toss-ups and 25 bonuses in corresponding categories). The match is over when all the toss-up questions have been read, or after two eight-minute halves have elapsed (ten-minute at the national competition), whichever occurs first. The team with the most points at this time is the winner.

Toss-ups
Every match begins with a toss-up question. The moderator announces the subject of the question (see "Subject Areas" above), as well as its type (Multiple Choice or Short Answer). Once the moderator completes the reading of the question, students have five seconds to buzz in and give an answer. Students may buzz in at any time after the category has been read — there is no need to wait for the moderator to finish. However, there is a penalty for interrupting the moderator and giving an incorrect answer. Once a student from a team has buzzed in, that team may not buzz in again on that question. Conferring between members of a team is not allowed on toss-up questions; if conferring occurs on a question, the team is disqualified from answering that question. The rules regarding conferring are typically very strict: excessive noise, eye contact, or even noticeable shifts in position can be considered conferring, as they convey information to teammates.

The moderator rules an answer given by a student correct or incorrect. On short answer questions, if the answer given differs from the official one, the moderator uses his or her judgment to make a ruling (which is subject to challenge by the competitors). On multiple-choice questions, the answer given by the student is only correct if it matches the official answer exactly. Alternatively, the student may give the letter choice that corresponds to the correct answer. The letters W, X, Y and Z are used in lieu of A, B, C and D to avoid confusion between similar-sounding letters.

The decision to require multiple-choice answers to be exact has been a controversial one, but experience has shown that it is the best way to avoid complicated disputes during matches.

Bonuses
If a student answers a toss-up question correctly, that student's team receives a bonus question. The bonus question is always in the same category as the corresponding toss-up question. Since only that team has the opportunity to answer the bonus question, there is no need to buzz in to answer it. After the moderator finishes reading the question, the team has twenty seconds to answer. Conferring between team members is permitted, but the designated team captain must give the team's final answer. Teams are given a 5-second warning after 15 seconds of the time allotted have elapsed.

Even if the clock runs out (either for the half or the round), a team that has correctly responded to a toss-up before the expiration of time still receives a bonus. The moderator/scientific judge ignores the timer and proceeds to read the question in its entirety, and the team receives the full 20 seconds of allotted response time. The half/round is completed as soon as the team's answer has been given and no more questions are read to either team.

The same rules apply to the judging of responses to bonus questions as apply to responses to toss-up questions. Once the team's answer has been ruled right or wrong, the moderator proceeds to the next toss-up question.

If neither team answers the toss-up question correctly, the bonus question is not read, and the moderator proceeds to the next toss-up question.

Scoring
The scoring at NMSSB is similar to scoring for Quiz Bowl, although with different numbers.

Correct responses to toss-up questions are worth 4 points each, and correct responses to bonus questions are worth 10 points each.

If a student buzzes in on a toss-up question before the moderator has completely read the question ("interrupting" the question) and responds incorrectly, then 4 points are awarded to the opposing team, and the question is re-read in its entirety so that the opposing team has an opportunity to buzz in.

Note the difference between interrupt scoring in Science Bowl and in Quiz Bowl: the interrupt penalty in Quiz Bowl is -5 to the interrupting team, while in Science Bowl it is +4 to the non-interrupting team.

Also, if a team "blurts" (shouts out the answer after buzzing but without recognition), the question is treated as an incorrect interrupt. If the judges rule that a team has conferred amongst themselves before buzzing in on a toss-up, that team is disqualified from answering the question and no points are awarded to either side.

Competition format
This section is concerned with the format of the national competition only. As is the case with competition rules, the competition format varies greatly among the different regional competitions.

The national competition always consists of two stages: round robin and double elimination.

Round robin
All competing teams are randomly arranged into several round robin groups of six teams each. Every team plays every other team in its group once, receiving 2 points for a win, 1 point for a tie, or zero points for a loss. The top 32 teams across all divisions make it into double elimination; however, it is done so that the same number of teams (or as close as possible to this) in each division make double elimination.

Tiebreaks
In the event that two or more teams are tied for one of the top four spots in a round robin group, there are several tiebreak procedures, applied in the following order:

 The head-to-head record of all the tied teams is compared. The team(s) with the best record against the other tied teams win(s) the tiebreak.
 The team(s) with the fewest losses win(s) the tiebreak.
 If the top four teams still cannot be determined, the following procedures are used:
 If more than two teams are still tied, each team is placed in a separate room and is read five toss-up questions. The number of questions answered correctly minus the number answered incorrectly determines each team's score. The team(s) with the highest score win(s) the tiebreak.
 If exactly two teams are still tied, the two teams compete head-to-head, receiving five toss-up questions (no bonus questions are used). All the usual toss-up rules are in effect, including the interrupt penalty. The team with the higher score wins the tiebreak.

If a tie still exists after the third tiebreak step, the third step is reapplied until the tie is resolved.

Double elimination
Starting in 2020, 32 teams advance from the round robin (as opposed to approximately 16 in prior years). The competition then proceeds like a typical double elimination tournament bracket. Unlike in the round robin, a match in double elimination cannot be tied. If a match is tied at the end of regulation, overtime periods of five questions each are played until the tie is broken.

As each team is eliminated from the original bracket, they proceed to the "Challenger's Bracket" for the second chance. By the end of the competition, this system produces a champion from each bracket. The two championship teams face off in the final round to determine the first and second-place winners.

Sponsors
Several companies and organizations sponsor the National Middle School Science Bowl competition, the most prominent being the United States Department of Energy. The National Renewable Energy Laboratory sponsors NMSSB, and General Motors is also a regular sponsor of the event and has in recent years sponsored the Hydrogen Fuel Cell Car competition held at NMSSB, where teams compete to build the fastest or most powerful fuel cell-powered miniature car.

Results at the national competition

2022

Academic competition
First Place: Odle Middle School (Bellevue, Washington)
Second Place: Jonas Clarke Middle School (Lexington, Massachusetts)
Third Place: Miller Middle School (San Jose, California)
Fourth Place: The Davidson Academy of Nevada (Reno, Nevada)

2021

Academic competition
First Place: Jonas Clarke Middle School (Lexington, Massachusetts)
Second Place: Wisconsin Hills Middle School (Brookfield, Wisconsin)
Third Place: Odle Middle School (Bellevue, Washington)
Fourth Place: Winston Churchill Middle School (Carmichael, California)

2020

Academic competition
First Place: Preston Middle School (Fort Collins, Colorado)
Second Place: Jonas Clarke Middle School (Lexington, Massachusetts)
Third Place: Ladue Middle School (Ladue, Missouri)
Fourth Place: Wisconsin Hills Middle School (Brookfield, Wisconsin)

2019

Academic competition
First Place: Jonas Clarke Middle School (Lexington, Massachusetts)
Second Place: Joaquin Miller Middle School
Third Place: Daniel Wright Junior High School 
Fourth Place: Rachel Carson Middle School

Cyber Challenge
First Place: Great Neck South Middle School
Second Place: Joaquin Miller Middle School
Third Place: Young Magnet High School

2018

Academic competition
First Place: Odle Middle School (Bellevue, Washington)
Second Place: Windemere Ranch Middle School
Third Place: Rachel Carson Middle School 
Fourth Place: Ames Middle School (Ames, Iowa)

Cyber Challenge
First Place: ?
Second Place: ?
Third Place: Centennial Middle School (Provo, Utah)

2017

Academic competition
First Place: Joaquin Miller Middle School
Second Place: Odle Middle School (Bellevue, Washington)
Third Place: Quail Valley Middle School
Fourth Place: Ladue Middle School

2016

Academic competition
First Place: Joaquin Miller Middle School
Second Place: Sycamore School
Third Place: Jonas Clarke Middle School
Fourth Place: Fort Settlement Middle School

2015

Academic competition
First Place: Fort Settlement Middle School
Second Place: Roberto Clemente Middle School
Third Place: Academy for Science and Design
Fourth Place: Hopkins Junior High School

2014

Academic competition
First Place: Greater Boston Science & Math
Second Place: JDroids Science Club
Third Place: Takoma Park Middle School
Fourth Place: Science Infinity Club

Electric Car Competition
First Place: Edison Computech
Second Place: Panhandle Junior High School
Third Place: Robert H. Sperreng Middle School
Fourth Place: Bret Harte Middle School

2013

Academic competition
First Place: Creekside Middle School
Second Place: Takoma Park Middle School
Third Place: Hopkins Junior High School
Fourth Place: Treasure Valley Math and Science Center (Boise, Idaho)

Electric Car competition
First Place: Edison Computech 7-8
Second Place: Treasure Valley Math and Science Center (Boise, Idaho)
Third Place: Albuquerque Academy
Fourth Place: Dumas Junior High School

2012
In 2012, the top 4 teams in both the academic competition and Hydrogen Fuel Cell Car Competition were:

Academic competition
First Place: Hopkins Junior High School
Second Place: Longfellow
Third Place: Seattle Science Infinity Club
Fourth Place: Treasure Valley Math and Science Center (Boise, Idaho)
Civility Award: Calloway County Middle School

Hydrogen Fuel Cell Car competition

Lithium Ion Car race
 First Place: Daniel Wright Junior High School
Second Place: Treasure Valley Math and Science Center (Boise, Idaho)
Third Place: Glasgow Middle School
Fourth Place: Van Antwerp Middle School

Design Document
First Place: Trinity Junior High School

2011
The top placing teams in the academic competition held in 2011 were:

Academic competition
First Place: Gale Ranch Middle School
Second Place: Shahala Middle School
Third Place: Hopkins Junior High School
Fourth Place: Van Antwerp Middle School
Civility Award: Home Schools of Eastern Iowa

Hydrogen Fuel Cell Car competition

Fuel Cell Car race
First Place: Blake Middle School
Second Place: Paducah Middle School
Third Place: Ingomar Middle School
Fourth Place: Albuquerque Academy

Design Document
 First Place: Home Schools of Eastern Iowa

2010
In 2009, there were two competitions: the academic competition and the solar car competition. There were two parts to the solar car competition: the actual race and the design document contest. 37 teams competed in the Nationals for the middle school.

Academic competition
First Place: Albuquerque Academy
Second Place: Gale Ranch Middle School
Third Place: Hopkins Junior High School
Fourth Place: Marshall Middle School (Pittsburgh, Pennsylvania)
Civility Award: Marshall Middle School (Pittsburgh, Pennsylvania)

Solar Car competition

Solar Car race
First Place: St. Christopher's
Second Place: Eleanor Roosevelt Middle School
Third Place: West Lafayette Science Club

Design Document
 First Place: Will James Middle School

2009
In 2009, there were two competitions: the academic competition and the hydrogen fuel cell car competition. There were two parts to the fuel cell competition: the actual race and the design document contest. For the first time, these competitions were held in Chevy Chase, Maryland, instead of in Colorado. 36 teams competed in the Nationals for the middle school.

Academic competition
 First Place: Hopkins Junior High School (Fremont, California)
 Second Place: Jonas Clarke Middle School (Lexington, Massachusetts)
 Third Place: Challenger School (Sunnyvale, California)
 Fourth Place: Albuquerque Academy (Albuquerque, New Mexico)
 Civility Award: Sierra Science Magnet (Las Cruces, New Mexico)

Hydrogen fuel cell car competition

Fuel cell car race
 First Place: St. Andrew's Episcopal School (Amarillo, Texas)
 Second Place: Van Antwerp Middle School (Niskayuna, New York)
 Third Place: Lincoln Middle School (Gainesville, Florida)

Design Document
 First Place: Will James Middle School

2008
In 2008, there were two competitions: the academic competition and the hydrogen fuel cell car competition. For the first time this year, the fuel cell car competition was divided into three parts: the fuel cell car race, a presentation on hydrogen, and a design document/presentation to be shown to judges at the event. A total of 36 teams competed.

Academic competition
 First Place: Challenger School (Newark, California)
 Second Place: Hopkins Junior High School (Fremont, California)
 Third Place: St. Andrew's Episcopal School (Amarillo, Texas)
 Civility Award: Lorenzo de Zavala Middle School (la Joya, Texas)

Hydrogen fuel cell car competition

Fuel cell car Overall
 First Place: Treasure Valley Math and Science Center (Boise, Idaho)

Fuel cell car race
 First Place: St. Andrew's Episcopal School (Amarillo, Texas)
 Second Place: Treasure Valley Math and Science Center (Boise, Idaho)
 Third Place: Triadelphia Middle School (Wheeling, West Virginia)
 Fourth Place: Ingomar Middle School in North Allegheny School District (Pittsburgh, Pennsylvania)

Hydrogen presentation
 First Place: Challenger School (Newark, California)

2007
In 2007, there were two competitions: the academic competition and the hydrogen fuel cell car competition.

Academic competition
 First Place: Honey Creek Middle School (Terre Haute, Indiana)
 Second Place: Challenger School (Newark, California)  (Not to be confused with Challenger School (Sunnyvale, California), which also competed in nationals and placed seventh.)
 Third Place: Longfellow Middle School (Falls Church, Virginia)
 Civility Award: Ann Richards Middle School (Mission, Texas)

Hydrogen fuel cell car competition
 First Place: St. Andrew's Episcopal School (Amarillo, Texas)
 Second Place: Salem Middle School (Apex, North Carolina)
 Third Place: Triadelphia Middle School (Wheeling, West Virginia)

2006
In 2006, there were two competitions: the academic competition and the hydrogen fuel cell car competition.

Academic competition
 First Place: Honey Creek Middle School (Terre Haute, Indiana)
 Second Place: Albuquerque Academy (Albuquerque, New Mexico)
 Third Place: Daniel Wright Junior High School (Lincolnshire, Illinois)
 Civility Award: Kenmoor Middle School (Landover, Maryland)

Hydrogen fuel cell car competition
 First Place: Daniel Wright Junior High School (Lincolnshire, Illinois)
 Second Place: R. D. and Euzelle P. Smith Middle School (Chapel Hill, North Carolina)
 Third Place: Westover Park Junior High School (Amarillo, Texas)

2005
In 2005, there were two competitions: the academic competition and the hydrogen fuel cell car competition.

Academic competition
 First Place: Honey Creek Middle School (Terre Haute, Indiana)
 Second Place: St. Andrew's Episcopal School (Amarillo, Texas)
 Third Place: Lincoln Middle School (Gainesville, Florida)
 Civility Award: Albuquerque Academy (Albuquerque, New Mexico)

Hydrogen fuel cell car competition
 First Place: R. D. and Euzelle P. Smith Middle School (Chapel Hill, North Carolina)
 Second Place: St. Andrew's Episcopal School (Amarillo, Texas)
 Third Place: Robert Frost Middle School (Rockville, Maryland)

2004
In 2004, there were three competitions: the academic competition, the hydrogen fuel cell car competition (stock class), and the hydrogen fuel cell car competition (open class).

Academic competition
The top three teams at the 2004 National Middle School Science Bowl Academic Competition were
 First Place: Ronald McNair Magnet School (Cocoa, Florida)
 Second Place: Lux Middle School (Lincoln, Nebraska)
 Third Place: Los Alamos Middle School (Los Alamos, New Mexico)
 Civility Award: Cincinnati Alliance (Cincinnati, Ohio)

Hydrogen fuel cell car competition (stock class)
 First Place: Doolen Middle School (Tucson, Arizona)
 Second Place: Roosevelt Middle School (River Forest, Illinois)
 Third Place: Brandon Middle School

Hydrogen fuel cell car competition (open class)
 First Place: Jenkins Middle School
 Second Place: Lux Middle School
 Third Place: Smith Middle School

2003
In 2003, there were two competitions: the academic competition and the solar car competition.

Academic competition
 First Place: College Station Middle School (College Station, Texas)
 Second Place: Roosevelt Middle School (River Forest, Illinois)
 Third Place: Albuquerque Academy (Albuquerque, New Mexico)
 Civility Award: St. Peter's Lutheran School (Columbus, Indiana)

Solar car competition
 First Place: Andrew Jackson Middle School (Titusville, Florida)
 Second Place: Inza R. Wood Middle School (Wilsonville, Oregon)
 Third Place: Tie between Bell Middle School (Golden, Colorado) and North Valley Middle School (La Salle, Colorado)

2002
In 2002, there were two competitions: the academic competition and the solar car competition.

Academic competition
 First Place: Samford Middle School (Auburn, Alabama)

Solar car competition
 First Place: Samford Middle School (Auburn, Alabama)

See also
 Quiz Bowl
 National Science Bowl

References

http://www.scied.science.doe.gov/nsb/pdf/2010_NSB_Rules_Final.pdf

External links
 Official National Science Bowl Website
 Science Bowl Test Program - Windows program that asks Science Bowl questions

Student quiz competitions
Science competitions
Science events in the United States